Masad may refer to:
Ala ud din Masud
Məsəd, Azerbaijan
Masad, Israel